Navy blue is a dark shade of the color blue.

Navy blue got its name from the dark blue (contrasted with naval white) worn by officers in the Royal Navy since 1748 and subsequently adopted by other navies around the world. When this color name, taken from the usual color of the uniforms of sailors, originally came into use in the early 19th century, it was initially called marine blue, but the name of the color soon changed to navy blue.

An early use of navy blue as a color name in English was in 1840 though the Oxford English Dictionary has a citation from 1813.

Variations

Indigo dye 

Indigo dye is the color that is called Añil (the Spanish word for "indigo dye") in the Guía de coloraciones (Guide to colorations) by Rosa Gallego and Juan Carlos Sanz, a color dictionary published in 2005 that is widely popular in the Hispanophone realm.

Indigo dye is the basis for all the historical navy blue colors, since in the 18th, 19th, and early 20th century, almost all navy uniforms were made by dyeing them with various shades of indigo dye.

Navy blue (Crayola) 

The Crayola color named "navy blue" is not as dark a shade as the standard navy blue shown above.

This tone of navy blue was formulated as a Crayola color in 1958.

Peacoat 

The source of this color is the "Pantone Textile Cotton eXtended (TCX)" color list, color #19-3920 TCX—Peacoat.

Purple navy 

Purple navy is a color that has been used by some navies. "Purple navy" in this color terminology usage is regarded as a shade of indigo, a color which can be regarded as a tone of purple when using the common English definition of purple, i.e., a color between blue and red.

The first recorded use of purple navy as a color name in English was in 1926.

The source of this color is Dictionary of Color Names (1955).

Persian indigo 

Another name for this color (seldom used nowadays) is regimental, because in the 19th century it was commonly used by many nations for navy uniforms.

The first recorded use of regimental (the original name for the color now called Persian indigo) as a color name in English was in 1912.

Space cadet 

Space cadet is one of the colors on the Resene Color List, a color list widely popular in Australia and New Zealand. The color was formulated in 2007.

This color is apparently a formulation of an impression of the color that cadets in space navy training would wear.

In culture

Computers 

 The color navy was one of the original 16 HTML/CSS colors  initially formulated for standardized computer display in the late 1980s.

Military 
 In many world navies, including the United States Navy and the Royal Canadian Navy, uniforms which are called navy blue are, in actuality, colored black, as the uniforms became darker due to counter fading. The Canadian Forces Dress Instructions specify that navy blue' is a tone of black". (See  also Uniforms of the United States Navy and Uniforms of the Canadian Forces.)

Music 
 Navy Blue is an album by Diane Renay (all the songs are about sailors).

Sports 
Navy blue is used by numerous professional and collegiate sports teams:

Association football
Scottish national team
United States men's and women's national teams
Falkirk F.C.
Tottenham Hotspur F.C.
West Bromwich Albion F.C.
Genoa C.F.C.
Melbourne Victory
FC Girondins de Bordeaux
Fenerbahçe S.K.
Paris Saint-Germain F.C.
Chicago Fire Soccer Club
Los Angeles Galaxy
New England Revolution
New York City F.C.
Philadelphia Union
Sporting Kansas City
Vancouver Whitecaps
Viking Stavanger

Australian Football League
Adelaide Crows
Carlton Blues
Geelong Cats
Melbourne Demons

Major League Baseball
Atlanta Braves
Boston Red Sox
Cleveland Guardians
Detroit Tigers
Houston Astros
Los Angeles Angels
Milwaukee Brewers
Minnesota Twins
New York Yankees
St. Louis Cardinals
Seattle Mariners
Tampa Bay Rays
Toronto Blue Jays
Washington Nationals

National Basketball Association
Cleveland Cavaliers
Dallas Mavericks
Denver Nuggets
Indiana Pacers
Memphis Grizzlies
Minnesota Timberwolves
New Orleans Pelicans
Oklahoma City Thunder
Utah Jazz
Washington Wizards

National Football League
Chicago Bears
Dallas Cowboys
Denver Broncos
Houston Texans
New England Patriots
Los Angeles Chargers
Seattle Seahawks
Tennessee Titans

National Hockey League
Colorado Avalanche
Columbus Blue Jackets
Edmonton Oilers
Florida Panthers
Nashville Predators
St. Louis Blues
Seattle Kraken
Washington Capitals
Winnipeg Jets

National Rugby League
Melbourne Storm
North Queensland Cowboys
Sydney Roosters

American Collegiate Teams
University of Arizona
University of California, Berkeley
University of Pittsburgh
Auburn University
Adamson University
Florida Atlantic University
Florida International University
Georgetown University
Georgia Institute of Technology
University of Illinois
University of Notre Dame
University of Maine
University of Michigan
University of Mississippi
University of Nevada, Reno
University of Virginia
Palm Beach Atlantic University
Pennsylvania State University
University of Rhode Island
Saint Mary's College of California
Shippensburg University of Pennsylvania
Syracuse University
West Virginia University
United States Naval Academy
Xavier University
Colegio de San Juan de Letran
Catawba College
University of Connecticut

See also 
 Air Force blue
 Army green
 Azure (color)
 List of colors
 Midnight blue
 Royal blue
 Sky blue

References

External links 
 

Shades of blue
Web colors